Juan Miguel Betancourt, S.E.M.V. (born June 1, 1970 in Ponce, Puerto Rico) is an American prelate of Puerto Rican descent of the Catholic Church.  He has been serving as auxiliary bishop for the Archdiocese of Hartford in Connecticut since 2018.

Biography

Early life 
Juan Miguel Betancourt was born in Ponce, Puerto Rico on June 1, 1970 to Miguel and Gloria Betancourt. He is the oldest of three children. Betancourt joined the Society of the Servants of the Eucharist and Mary on January 1, 1992, and took perpetual vows to the order on August 6, 2000. 

Betancourt graduated with a Bachelor of Natural Sciences degree from the University of Puerto Rico and received a Master of Divinity degree from the Pontifical Catholic University of Puerto Rico in Ponce.

Priesthood 
On April 21, 2001, Betancourt was ordained a priest in Puerto Rico by Bishop Iñaki Mallona Txertudi for the Servants of the Eucharist and Mary.  Following his ordination, Betancourt went to Rome to study at the Pontifical Biblical Institute, earning a Licentiate in Sacred Scripture in 2005. After returning to Puerto Rico, he taught at the Pontifical Catholic University of Puerto Rico and the Regina Cleri Major Seminary, both in Ponce, for one year.

In 2006, Betancourt was assigned by his order to be the pastor of St. Francis de Sales Parish in the Archdiocese of Saint Paul and Minneapolis in Minnesota.  He also served as a professor of sacred scripture at the Saint Paul Seminary School of Divinity in St. Paul, Minnesota and as a vice rector of formation and associate academic dean from 2006 until 2018. He taught undergraduate theology at the University of St. Thomas in Minnesota from 2006 through 2009.

Episcopacy 

On September 18, 2018, Pope Francis appointed Betancourt as titular bishop of Curzola and auxiliary bishop of the Archdiocese of Hartford. He was consecrated on October 18, 2018 at the Cathedral of St. Joseph in Hartford by Archbishop Leonard Blair, with Archbishop Timothy Broglio and Bishop Andrew H. Cozzens as co-consecrators.

See also

 Catholic Church hierarchy
 Catholic Church in the United States
 Historical list of the Catholic bishops of the United States
 List of Catholic bishops of the United States
 Lists of patriarchs, archbishops, and bishops

References

External links

 Diocese of Hartford Official Site

21st-century Roman Catholic bishops in the United States
1970 births
Living people
Pontifical Catholic University of Puerto Rico alumni
Puerto Rican Roman Catholic priests
Roman Catholic Archdiocese of Saint Paul and Minneapolis
Roman Catholic Archdiocese of Hartford
Religious leaders from Minnesota
Religious leaders from Connecticut
Clergy from Ponce
Bishops appointed by Pope Francis